Barry Silkman (born 29 June 1952) is a football agent and former player, who played as a midfielder for 11 clubs including at Manchester City in 1979 and at Leyton Orient from 1981 to 1985. He competed for 16 years. In total, he made 340 professional appearances, and scored 31 goals. In the 1990s he became an agent. Metro named him as the 10th-most influential agent in football in 2013.

Playing career
In 1973, to obtain Silkman Barnet offered Wimbledon what was then a record fee for a non-league player, and his earnings rose from £5 a week to £20 a week.

Silkman also played for Hereford United (1974–1976), Crystal Palace (1976–1978), Plymouth Argyle (1978–1979), Luton Town (on loan 1979), Brentford (1980), Queens Park Rangers (1980–1981), Southend United (1985–1986) and Crewe Alexandra (1986). He was also a player-coach at Leyton Orient for three seasons with Frank Clark as manager.

It was at Plymouth that Silkman first came to the attention of Malcolm Allison, who deemed him to be a suitable player to bolster Manchester City's midfield as they struggled in the First Division.

In total, he made 340 professional appearances, and scored 31 goals.

Silkman was a member of the gold-medal winning 45-plus Team GB at the 2009 Maccabiah Games in Israel.

Managerial career
In November 2018, Silkman was briefly appointed manager of Staines Town, before leaving the club due to the Football Association deeming the job to represent a conflict of interests with his work as an agent.

He coached the Team GB 45-plus football squad at the 2013 Maccabiah Games in Israel.

Agent career 
After retiring from football, Silkman became an agent. Metro named him as the 10th most influential agent in football in 2013. He said: "It's not the greatest job in the world, and can be very frustrating."

Personal life
Silkman was born in Whitechapel in East London, and brought up in the East End of London.  His mother is Ginny.  He is Jewish, had a bar mitzvah, and said in 2013: "I was brought up Jewish and I'm Jewish through and through."

He was a student at Canon Barnett Primary and Robert Montefiore Secondary schools.

Silkman has been involved in greyhound training and greyhound racing, with his dogs Half Awake, Skomal and Carlsberg Champ respectively winning the 1987 Gold Collar (Catford), 1988 Guineas (Hackney) and the 1990 Cesarewitch (Belle Vue). He is also involved in horse racing and is a presenter on Racing Post Greyhound TV.

Career statistics

See also
List of select Jewish association football (soccer) players

References

External links
 

1952 births
Footballers from Stepney
Living people
English Jews
Jewish footballers
Jewish British sportspeople
English footballers
British sports agents
Barnet F.C. players
Grays Athletic F.C. players
Brentford F.C. players
Crewe Alexandra F.C. players
Crystal Palace F.C. players
Hereford United F.C. players
Leyton Orient F.C. players
Luton Town F.C. players
Manchester City F.C. players
Plymouth Argyle F.C. players
Queens Park Rangers F.C. players
Southend United F.C. players
Wimbledon F.C. players
Chelmsford City F.C. players
Wycombe Wanderers F.C. players
Association football midfielders
English Football League players
Maccabi Tel Aviv F.C. players
Wingate & Finchley F.C. players
Staines Town F.C. managers
English expatriate sportspeople in Israel
English expatriate footballers
Expatriate footballers in Israel
British greyhound racing trainers
English football managers
Competitors at the 2009 Maccabiah Games
Maccabiah Games medalists in football
Maccabiah Games gold medalists for Great Britain